The Himalayan Expressway is a 27.5 km stretch of highway in India that runs through the Shivaliks at the trijunction of Haryana, Punjab, and Himachal Pradesh. It is part of the Chandigarh–Shimla Expressway which connects Zirakpur in Punjab to Parwanoo in Himachal Pradesh. The stretch runs through 2 km in Zirakpur, Punjab, 21 km in Panchkula, Haryana, and 4.5 km in Parwanoo, Himachal Pradesh. It was constructed by Jaypee Group.

Benefits 
Although the road cuts short the distance between Zirakpur and Parwanoo by only 3 km, but it helps save fuel and cuts time of travel between Delhi and Shimla by 1 hour to 7 hours, by helping commuters bypass the congested towns of Pinjore and Kalka.

Salient Features 
 The stretch has 32 structures including a rail overbridge, two flyovers and 11 bridges. 
 Total Project cost Rs.412 Crore.
 The 14-lane toll plaza at Chandimandir, is the first plaza in India to be fitted with radio frequency identification (RFID) technology.
 For better monitoring of mishaps, it is fitted with video incident detection system (VIDS).

References 

Expressways in Haryana
Expressways in Punjab, India
Expressways in Himachal Pradesh